Tang Ab (also Romanized as Tang Āb) is a village in Juyom Rural District, Juyom District, Larestan County, Fars Province, Iran. At the 2006 census, its population was 303, in 60 families.

References 

Populated places in Larestan County